Hong Kong 1941 is a 1984 Hong Kong war drama film directed by Po-Chih Leong, produced by John Shum and written by Sammo Hung. The film stars Chow Yun-fat, Cecilia Yip and Alex Man. For his performance in this film, Chow was awarded his first Golden Horse Award for Best Leading Actor.

Synopsis
The film takes places shortly before and during the Japanese occupation of Hong Kong during World War II. The story of three young friends focuses on their sufferings as Hong Kong falls under oppressive occupation.

Years later, a woman narrates her personal story of the Japanese takeover of Hong Kong in 1941. She's Nam, young, attractive, daughter of a wealthy rice merchant, and prey to painful, disabling seizures. Her boyhood friend is Coolie Keung, whose family used to have wealth; he's now impoverished, a tough kid, a leader, in love with her. Into the mix steps Fei, cool and resourceful, an actor from the north, intent on getting to Gold Mountain in the US or Australia. They form a trio, but the day they are to leave Hong Kong, the invasion stops them. Fei must rescue Keung from collaborators, Nam falls in love with Fei, and danger awaits their next attempt to escape

Filming locations
Yu Yuen a large residential building built in 1927 in Tung Tau Wai, Wang Chau, is featured in the film.

Cast and roles
 Chow Yun-fat as Yip Kim-fei
 Cecilia Yip as Han Yuk-nam
 Alex Man as Wong Hak-keung
 Shih Kien as Ha Chung-sun, Nam's father
 Wu Ma as Chairman Liu Yan-mau
 Paul Chun as Fa Wing
 Ku Feng as Shui / Shiu
 Stuart Ong as General Kanezawa
 Billy Lau as Factory Foreman
 Angela Yu Chien as Fei's Aunt
 Chu Tau as Liu's men
 Chow Kam-kong Liu's man
 Po-Chih Leong as Emperor
 Chin Ka-lok (extra)
 Pang Yun-cheung (extra)
 Lee Chi-kit (extra)

Awards and nominations

References

External links
 
 
 Hong Kong Cinemagic entry

1984 films
1984 drama films
1980s war drama films
1980s Cantonese-language films
Films about rape
Films set in Hong Kong
Hong Kong war drama films
Pacific War films
Second Sino-Japanese War films
1980s Hong Kong films